Redefine the Enemy! Rarities and B-Sides Compilation 1992–1999 is a B-side compilation of rare and live recordings by the seminal digital hardcore band Atari Teenage Riot.

Track listing
"No Remorse" (Live in NY '99) - 5:37 (taken from Too Dead for Me EP)
"Revolution Action" (Live in San Fran '99) - 4:44 (taken from Too Dead for Me EP)
"Paranoid" (7" Remix) - 3:06
"Sick to Death" (Remix '97) - 5:55
"Deutschland (Has Gotta Die!)" (Remix) - 2:50
"You Can't Hold Us Back" (Instrumental) - 3:58
"Death of a President - DIY" (A Capella '99) - 0:27 (taken from Too Dead for Me EP)
"We've Got the Fucking Power" (Original '97) - 4:42
"Not Your Business" (Radio Version '95) - 2:30
"No Success" (hardbase Remix '99) - 4:18
"Midijunkies" (Remix '93) - 5:19
"Waves of Disaster" (Instrumental '97) - 5:08
"Waves of Disaster" (A Capella '97) - 4:19
"Redefine the Enemy" ('97) - 3:53
"Destroy 2000 Years of Culture" (Remix '97) - 4:22
"Sex" (Original Full Length Version '93) - 14:25

References

External links

Atari Teenage Riot albums
2002 compilation albums